Brother's Shadow is a 2006 American drama film starring Scott Cohen and Judd Hirsch.

Plot

Cast
Scott Cohen as Jake Groden
Judd Hirsch as Leo Groden
Susan Floyd as Emily Groden
Ruben Santiago-Hudson as Manny Botero
Elliot Korte as Adam Groden
James Murtaugh as Hank Stafford

References

External links
 
 
 

American drama films
2006 drama films
2006 films
2000s English-language films
2000s American films